Laos national under-23 football team (also known as Laos Under-23, Laos U-23 or Laos Olympic Team) represents Laos in international football competitions in Olympic Games, Asian Games and SEA Games, as well as any other under-23 international football tournaments.

Competition history

Olympic record

AFC U-23 Asian Cup record

Asian Games record

SEA Games record 

Since 2001, the SEA Games football tournament became available for under-23 teams only.

AFF U-23 Youth Championship

Schedule and results 

The following is a list of Laos' match results in the last 12 months, as well as any future matches that have been scheduled.

2022

Players

Current squad
The following players were selected for the 2021 Southeast Asian Games.
Information correct as of 7 May 2022, after the match against .

Coaching staff

See also 
 Laos national football team
 Laos women's national football team
 Laos national under-21 football team
 Laos national under-20 football team
 Laos national under-17 football team

Notes

References 

Asian national under-23 association football teams
Under-23